The 1963 North Carolina Tar Heels football team represented the University of North Carolina at Chapel Hill during the 1963 NCAA University Division football season. The Tar Heels were led by fifth-year head coach Jim Hickey and played their home games at Kenan Memorial Stadium. They competed as members of the Atlantic Coast Conference, finishing as co-champions with a league record of 6–1.

Bob Lacey led the ACC in receiving with 48 catches for 533 yards. He was selected as a first-team All-American by the Associated Press, Football Writers Association of America and NEA.

Schedule

References

North Carolina
North Carolina Tar Heels football seasons
Atlantic Coast Conference football champion seasons
Gator Bowl champion seasons
North Carolina Tar Heels football